Vanasthalipuram is a residential neighborhood in Hyderabad, Telangana, India. It comes under Hayathnagar Mandal and  Hayathnagar Revenue Division in L.B. Nagar zone along the highway towards Vijayawada a  During the rule of the Nizam of Hyderabad, the area was a dense forest with wild animals and famous as a hunting ground, hence the name Vanasthalipuram (Vana="forest"+sthali="place"+puram-a locality or site). Vanasthalipuram derived its name from Harini Vanasthali, a deer park located beside national highway. It was originally known as Shikharghar. Now, Vanasthalipuram is famously known as retirees paradise. With booming IT in Hyderabad and TCS opening its south operations in Adibatla (close to Vanasthalipuram), the place is seeing an unprecedented real estate boom.

Landmarks 

Mahavira Harina Vanasthali (deer park), Saheb Nagar Trinetra Hanuman Temple, Venkateswara Swamy temple and Ganesh Temple are some of the attractions of this area.

References 

Neighbourhoods in Hyderabad, India
Municipal wards of Hyderabad, India